Kyana is an unincorporated community located on Indiana State Road 64 in Jackson Township, Dubois County, in the U.S. state of Indiana.

History
Kyana was platted in 1883. The town had its own zip code until 1980. The town was an outgrowth of the construction of the Louisville, Evansville & St. Louis Railroad (now Norfolk Southern). Founded by the Louisville Mining & Manufacturing Company, it bears the abbreviation of its home state (Kentucky), and the termination of the state in which it is located.

A post office was established at Kyana in 1882, and remained in operation until it was discontinued in 1982.

Kyana was the site of a plane crash on August 28, 1948. A two-seat Aeronca training plane piloted by William Mullen, Jr. was flying at a low altitude when it suddenly dived into the ground in a field near Kyana. The passenger in the plane, Emil Prechtel of nearby Schnellville, died as a result of injuries from the crash. The pilot survived.

Notable people
Joel Newkirk, Major League pitcher (Chicago Cubs)

Geography

References

Unincorporated communities in Dubois County, Indiana
Unincorporated communities in Indiana